Repair shop may refer to:

 an automobile repair shop, including body shops
 a railway repair shop or Ausbesserungswerk (in German-speaking countries)
 a military backshop
 a military logistics center that acts as a repair depot
 a workshop

Other uses 
 The Repair Shop, a British television series

See also 
 Home repair
 Maintenance, repair and operations